Rampur Lok Sabha constituency is one of the 80 Lok Sabha (parliamentary) constituencies in Uttar Pradesh state in northern India.

Assembly segments
Presently, Rampur Lok Sabha constituency comprises five Vidhan Sabha (legislative assembly) segments. These are:

^Akash Saxena of the BJP won Rampur assembly segment in 2022 by-elections in December 2022.

Members of Parliament

^ By-poll

Election results

2022 by-election

General election 2019

General election 2014

See also
 Rampur district
 List of Constituencies of the Lok Sabha

Notes

External links
Rampur lok sabha  constituency election 2019 result details

Lok Sabha constituencies in Uttar Pradesh
Rampur district